The Watchtower is a  mountain summit located in the Maligne River valley of Jasper National Park, in the Canadian Rockies of Alberta, Canada. It is situated in the Maligne Range and is visible from the Maligne Lake Road where it towers over Medicine Lake. Its nearest higher peak is Sirdar Mountain,  to the north.


History
The mountain was named in 1916 by Morrison P. Bridgland (1878-1948), a Dominion Land Surveyor who named many peaks in Jasper Park and the Canadian Rockies. The mountain's name was officially adopted in 1947 when approved by the Geographical Names Board of Canada.

The first ascent of The Watchtower was made in 1951 by R.K. Irvin, J. Mowat, and R. Strong.

Geology
The Watchtower is composed of sedimentary rock laid down during the Cambrian period and pushed east and over the top of younger rock during the Laramide orogeny.

Climate
Based on the Köppen climate classification, The Watchtower is located in a subarctic climate zone with long, cold, snowy winters, and mild summers. Temperatures can drop below -20 °C with wind chill factors below -30 °C. Precipitation runoff from the mountain drains into Excelsior Creek and Watchtower Creek, both tributaries of the Maligne River which in turn empties into the Athabasca River.

See also
 Geography of Alberta

References

Gallery

External links
 Parks Canada web site: Jasper National Park

Two-thousanders of Alberta
Canadian Rockies
Mountains of Jasper National Park
Alberta's Rockies